Milburn is a town in Johnston County, Oklahoma, United States, along the Blue River. The population was 317 at the 2010 census, an increase of 1.6 percent from the figure of 312 in 2000. The town is notable as the location of the Chickasaw White House, the former home of Chickasaw Governor Douglas H. Johnston. This home is now a museum and is listed on the NRHP.

History
When the Western Oklahoma Railroad (later known as the Choctaw Oklahoma and Gulf Railroad) was built, W. J. Milburn, a druggist from Emet, Emet, persuaded the Chickasaw landowner, M. C. Condon, to give Milburn the power of attorney to negotiate a new townsite near the railroad. Milburn tried to persuade the postmaster at Ellen to move his location to the new site and rename it. He submitted the name Condon, which the Post Office rejected. Many names were proposed for the new town. Initially, the railroad wanted to name it Morris, then changed to McLish. Finally, the name Milburn was agreed upon in August, 1901.

By 1904, Milburn had sufficient population to incorporate as a Chickasaw town. After Oklahoma became a state in 1907, an election was held to choose the new Johnston County seat. Milburn lost to Tishomingo.

Geography
Milburn is located at  (34.241030, -96.550601).

Demographics

As of the census of 2000, there were 312 people, 114 households, and 84 families residing in the town. There were 124 housing units at an average density of 260.0 per square mile (99.7/km2). The racial makeup of the town was 88.78% White, 6.73% Native American, 0.32% from other races, and 4.17% from two or more races. Hispanic or Latino of any race were 0.96% of the population.

There were 114 households, out of which 33.3% had children under the age of 18 living with them, 57.9% were married couples living together, 11.4% had a female householder with no husband present, and 26.3% were non-families. 23.7% of all households were made up of individuals, and 10.5% had someone living alone who was 65 years of age or older. The average household size was 2.74 and the average family size was 3.30.

In the town, the population was spread out, with 30.8% under the age of 18, 7.1% from 18 to 24, 28.5% from 25 to 44, 21.2% from 45 to 64, and 12.5% who were 65 years of age or older. The median age was 36 years. For every 100 females, there were 81.4 males. For every 100 females age 18 and over, there were 83.1 males.

The median income for a household in the town was $21,528, and the median income for a family was $29,375. Males had a median income of $24,375 versus $18,125 for females. The per capita income for the town was $10,322. About 24.7% of families and 29.4% of the population were below the poverty line, including 29.3% of those under age 18 and 36.0% of those age 65 or over.

Notes

References

Towns in Johnston County, Oklahoma
Towns in Oklahoma